Chinese People, One more effort, to be revolutionaries! (Chinois, encore un effort pour être révolutionnaires) a.k.a. Peking Duck Soup is a 1977 film by Situationist director René Viénet.

Unlike his earlier films Can dialectics break bricks? and The Girls of Kamare, which "detourned" drama films, in this one, Viénet uses a great variety of sources (particularly archive footage of People's Republic of China leaders) to compose a political documentary sharply critical of Mao's legacy in China.

The title is a reference to the pamphlet "Français, encore un effort si vous voulez être républicains" featured in Philosophy in the Bedroom of Marquis de Sade.

External links 
Chinois, encore un effort pour être révolutionnaires at the IMDb
Chinois, encore un effort pour être révolutionnaires in public domain at UbuWeb
Chinous, encore un effort pour être révolutionnaires on 0xDB
Chinois, encore un effort pour être révolutionnaires at Situationnisteblog

1977 films
French documentary films
1970s French-language films
Mandarin-language films
1977 documentary films
Documentary films about China
Documentary films about revolutions
1970s French films